The South African cricket team toured England in the 1951 season to play a five-match Test series against England.

England won the series 3-1 with 1 match drawn.

South African team
The South African team was captained by Dudley Nourse, with Eric Rowan as vice-captain. The manager was Sid Pegler who had toured England as a player with the South African cricket team of 1912 and 1924.

The full team was:
 Dudley Nourse, captain
 Eric Rowan, vice-captain
 Jack Cheetham
 Geoff Chubb
 Russell Endean, wicketkeeper
 George Fullerton
 Tufty Mann
 Percy Mansell
 Cuan McCarthy
 Jackie McGlew
 Roy McLean
 Michael Melle
 Athol Rowan
 Hugh Tayfield
 Clive van Ryneveld
 John Waite, wicketkeeper

Tayfield was not originally chosen, but joined the party in May when it was feared that Athol Rowan's health might not be up to a full tour. Fullerton had kept wicket on the 1947 tour, but did not keep wicket at all in this tour, being played as a batsman. Endean was used as the second wicketkeeper on this tour, including one Test, but then did not keep wicket when he toured England for a second time with the 1955 team.

Nourse, Fullerton, Mann and Athol Rowan had toured England with the 1947 team; Nourse and Eric Rowan had toured with the 1935 side. Cheetham, Endean, Mansell, McGlew, McLean, Tayfield and Waite returned to England with the 1955 side, and McGlew, McLean, Tayfield and Waite came back for a third time with the 1960 team.

Before this 1951 tour, Chubb, Endean, Mansell, McGlew, McLean, van Ryneveld and Waite had not previously played Test cricket. Chubb, McGlew, van Ryneveld and Waite made their Test debuts in the first Test of this tour, and the other three had all appeared in Test cricket by the end of the series. The only player on the tour who did not appear in any of the Tests was Tayfield, who had previously played Test cricket for South Africa in 1949-50.

Test series summary

First Test

Second Test

Third Test

Fourth Test

Fifth Test

References

Annual reviews
 Playfair Cricket Annual 1952
 Wisden Cricketers' Almanack 1952

Further reading
 Bill Frindall, The Wisden Book of Test Cricket 1877-1978, Wisden, 1979
 various writers, A Century of South Africa in Test & International Cricket 1889-1989, Ball, 1989

External links
 CricketArchive

1951 in English cricket
1951 in South African cricket
International cricket competitions from 1945–46 to 1960
1951